Jugni is an Indian romantic musical film written and directed by debutant filmmaker Shefali Bhushan. The movie deals with a music composer who travels to a village in India in search of a golden voice. The term jugni has a double meaning; the term is usually used to connote a female firefly, while in Punjabi folk music, it refers to a narrative device in which an outside observer comments with humorous or sad remarks on occurring events.

The film is a traditional musical composed by Clinton Cerejo and consists of singing contributions from several Indian film composers including Vishal Bharadwaj and A.R. Rahman. The film was distributed by PVR Pictures and released nationwide in India on January 22, 2016. It has been selected to be shown at several film festivals including the London Indian Film Festival, the Indian Film Festival, the Hague, Avvantura film festival, Zadar, River to River Indian Film Festival, FOG festival, USA and others.

Plot 
Jugni (Firefly) is the beat of the soul, the free-flying spirit. Jugni is Vibhavari or 'Vibs' (Sugandha Garg). Vibs is a music director, working on her first big break in the Hindi film industry. When work and home affairs, with her live-in boyfriend Sid (Samir Sharma) hit a high tide, Vibs hits the road with a glint of hope; to find music. The journey takes her to a village in Punjab in the search of a Bibi Saroop (Sadhana Singh), whose voice holds the promise that Vibs is searching for. But as the twist of fate would have it, Mastana (Siddhant Behl), Bibi's son and a proficient singer himself, is the voice and man who winds his way into Vibs' heart. From here on, Jugni is about striking balances, making tough decisions while trying to soften the blows and dealing with the studied dramatic turns and unpredictabilities of life and finding the place which one can call home; home of the heart, where the firefly is at her brightest.

Cast 
Sugandha Garg as Vibhavari
Sadhana Singh as Bibi Saroop
Siddhant Behl as Mastana
Anurita Jha as Preeto
Samir Sharma as Sidharth
Chandan Gill as Jeeta Jazbaati
Kartick Sitaraman as Nishant (Director)
Devinder Daman as Babaji
Divya Unny as TV Actress

Soundtrack 

The film's soundtrack comprises 12 songs and 11 songs was composed by Clinton Cerejo and the other one was composed by Kaashif sung by the Oscar winner A. R. Rahman.

See also 
List of Bollywood films of 2016

References

External links 
 

2016 films
Films scored by Clinton Cerejo